The Four Greats (Danish and Norwegian de fire store) is a term used for four of the most influential Norwegian writers of the late 19th century.

The Four Greats were:
Henrik Ibsen (1828–1906) playwright, theatre director, and poet who introduced Theatrical realism to the Norwegian stage. 
Bjørnstjerne Bjørnson (1832–1910) novelist, dramatist and playwright who became the first Norwegian Nobel laureate. 
Jonas Lie (1833–1908)  novelist, poet, and playwright focusing largely on the folk life and social spirit of the nation of Norway. 
Alexander Kielland   (1849–1906) novelist, short story writer, playwright, essayist most known for his satirical writings and short stories. 
As an addition to this list, a positive argument exists for Amalie Skram:  Som forfattar tilhøyrde ho "dei store" saman med Ibsen, Bjørnson, Kielland og Lie. Ho møtte stor motstand for diktinga i si eiga samtid. Sin første roman måtte ho gi ut på eiga hand, då forlaget meinte at innhaldet var for provoserande. [As an author, she belonged to "the greats" together with Ibsen, Bjørnson, Kielland and Lie. She faced great opposition to her writings in her own time. She had to publish her first novel on her own, as the publisher thought the content was too provocative.]

Originally a publicity gimmick introduced by their publisher, Gyldendal, the term stuck and is still widely used for these writers. The four authors had in common that they to some extent belonged to the same generation and were influential in Literary realism within Norway during the period 1860–1890. Additionally Bjørnson, Ibsen and Lie all attended the same school in Christiania (now Oslo), Heltberg Latin School (Heltbergs Studentfabrikk). The school had been founded in  1846  by Henrik Heltberg (1806–1873) and Wessel Reehorst (1824–1910) to prepare students for their university matriculation.

Gallery

References

Related reading
Beyer,  Harald; translation by Einar Haugen (1979) A History of Norwegian Literature  (New York University Press) 
Naess, Harald S. (1993)  A History of Norwegian Literature (University of Nebraska Press) 

Norwegian literature